Radial Road 1 (R-1), informally known as the R-1 Road, is a network of roads and bridges that all together form the first arterial road of Metro Manila in the Philippines.

Route description

Mel Lopez Boulevard 

Between the northern terminus of R-1 at Roxas Bridge and Anda Circle, it is known as Mel Lopez Boulevard. This segment is formerly part of Bonifacio Drive until it was renamed in April 2019 by virtue of Republic Act No. 11280. The renamed boulevard itself is commonly known as R-10, running north of Roxas Bridge which the boulevard is part of.

Bonifacio Drive 

Between Anda Circle and Padre Burgos Avenue, R-1 is known as Bonifacio Drive. It serves the districts of Intramuros and Port Area and meets Roxas Boulevard in Rizal Park.

Roxas Boulevard 

R-1 becomes Roxas Boulevard after intersecting with Padre Burgos Avenue. This section of R-1 passes through the kilometer zero of the Philippines in Rizal Park. It is a waterfront promenade which leads out of Ermita and Malate in the city of Manila into Pasay and Parañaque. Roxas Boulevard ends at the junction with NAIA Road and Seaside Drive.

Manila–Cavite Expressway 

Between the NAIA Road and the Antero Soriano Highway in Kawit, Cavite, R-1 is known as the Manila–Cavite Expressway (also known as Coastal Road and CAVITEX). This toll road connects Parañaque with Las Piñas and leaves Metro Manila for Bacoor and Kawit in the province of Cavite.

Antero Soriano Highway 

R-1 is known as the Antero Soriano Highway from the CAVITEX's terminus in Kawit to Governor's Drive in Naic. It connects the Cavite municipalities of Noveleta, Rosario, Tanza, and the cities of General Trias, and Imus along the coast of Manila Bay in Cavite.

Notes

References 

Routes in Metro Manila